Limido Comasco (locally   or  ) is a comune (municipality) in the Province of Como in the Italian region Lombardy, located about  northwest of Milan and about  southwest of Como. As of 31 December 2004, it had a population of 2,579 and an area of 4.5 km².

The municipality of Limido Comasco contains the frazione (subdivision) Cascina Restelli.

Limido Comasco borders the following municipalities: Cislago, Fenegrò, Lurago Marinone, Mozzate, Turate.

Demographic evolution

References

External links
 www.comune.limidocomasco.co.it/

Cities and towns in Lombardy